Jay O'Brien (born November 4, 1999) is an American collegiate ice hockey center currently playing for Boston University of the Hockey East (HE). He was drafted in the first round, 19th overall, by the Philadelphia Flyers in the 2018 NHL Entry Draft.

Early life
O'Brien was born in Hingham, Massachusetts. Before his senior year of high school, O'Brien was given the option to leave Thayer Academy early and join the Youngstown Phantoms in the United States Hockey League. O'Brien chose to stay at Thayer Academy and put up 80 points in 30 games, a new career high, during the 2017–18 season. Following the 2017–18 season, O'Brien was awarded United States High School All-USA Hockey Player of the Year and was named to the USHS All-USA Hockey First Team. Although O'Brien spent the majority of the season playing high school league hockey, he did play one game for the Phantoms and joined the United States under-18 team for seven exhibition games.

Career 
Following graduation from Thayer Academy, O'Brien joined the Providence College Friars of the Hockey East in the NCAA. As a freshman with the Friars in the 2018–19 season, O'Brien struggled to define a role for himself, struggling through injury he was limited to 25 games, totalling just 2 goals and 5 points.

Opting to enter the NCAA transfer system and end his tenure with Providence, O'Brien agreed to join Canadian junior team the Penticton Vees of the British Columbia Hockey League (BCHL) for the 2019–20 season. He later agreed to join fellow Hockey East competitor in Boston University for the 2020–21 season prior to his tenure in the BCHL.

International play 

After playing 10 games for the Friars, O'Brien was loaned to the United States National Junior Team to compete at the 2019 World Junior Ice Hockey Championships.

Career statistics

Regular season and playoffs

International

References

External links
 

1999 births
Living people
American men's ice hockey centers
National Hockey League first-round draft picks
Penticton Vees players
Philadelphia Flyers draft picks
Providence Friars men's ice hockey players
Youngstown Phantoms players
Boston University Terriers men's ice hockey players